Institutional psychotherapy (also known as institutional analysis) is a French psychiatric reform movement and approach to group psychotherapy influenced by Marxism and Lacanian psychoanalysis starting in the 1950s. The Association of Institutional Psychotherapy was founded in November 1965. Those associated with the approach include François Tosquelles, Jean Oury, Felix Guattari, Frantz Fanon, and Georges Canguilhem. Institutional psychotherapy proposed a radical restructuring of the insane asylum and the mental health clinic where patients actively participated in running the facility. The approach began in Saint-Alban-sur-Limagnole with Tosquelles, Fanon and Oury, and then continued at the La Borde clinic founded by Oury and where Guattari worked until his death. Institutional psychotherapy is also practiced by Patrick Chemla at the Centre Artaud in Reims and has spread to Spain and Italy.

Although similar to anti-psychiatry in its institutional critique, the founders of institutional psychotherapy were adamant about distinguishing their approach from it, claiming that anti-psychiatry failed to account for the reality of mental illness, arguing that psychosis is not merely a social construct and were open to neuroleptics and even at times to electroshock treatment. Guattari wrote of a "systematic failure" of many psychiatrists to understand "what was going on outside the hospital walls", leading to a tendency to psychologize social problems. The goal according to Guattari was to "never to isolate the study of mental illness from its social and institutional context, and...to analyze institutions on the basis of interpreting the real, symbolic and imaginary effects of society upon individuals."

Institutional psychotherapy and the terminology used by the group of psychoanalysts associated with the approach took on a noticeable evolution throughout the 1960s to 1980s. After Guattari began to distance himself from the concept of schizoanalysis only one year after the publication of Anti-Oedipus (1972), later Guattari proposed that "institutional analysis" be used instead of "institutional psychotherapy". This change in nomenclature represented Guattari's intention to direct the practice at La Borde in a more political direction, calling for "a political analysis of desire. Guattari offered an extensive critique of institutional psychotherapy in the beginning of Molecular Revolution (1984) and introduced the concept of "institutional analysis". Guattari referred to the interactive transference that occurred at the La Borde clinic as "transversality", while Oury called it "transferential constellation".

See also
 Schizoanalysis
 Anti-psychiatry
 La Borde clinic
 Institutional pedagogy

External links
 http://www.bbk.ac.uk/hiddenpersuaders/blog/robcis-interview/
 Jean Oury and La Borde. Conversation with Camille Robcis. http://somatosphere.net/2014/jean-oury-and-clinique-de-la-borde-a-conversation-with-camille-robcis.html/
 Susana Caló, The Grid, 2016. https://www.anthropocene-curriculum.org/contribution/the-grid
 https://epg.pubpub.org/pub/03-institutional-therapy/release/1
 Susana Caló, Can an Institution be Militant?, 2019. https://www.academia.edu/38568214/Can_an_Institution_be_Militant

Further reading
 Felix Guattari, The Molecular Revolution: Psychiatry and Politics, 1984 - https://machinicunconsciousmachine.files.wordpress.com/2014/02/molecularrevolutions.pdf
 Georges Canguilhem, The Normal and the Pathological, 1991 - https://monoskop.org/images/b/b6/Canguilhem_Georges_The_Normal_and_the_Pathologic_1991.pdf
 Francois Dosse, Gilles Deleuze and Félix Guattari: Intersecting Lives, 2011

Psychotherapy